King and Georgiana was an electoral district of the Legislative Assembly in the Australian state of New South Wales from 1856 to 1859, named after King and Georgiana counties, including Yass and Taralga. Its only member was Peter Faucett. It was largely replaced by the electoral district of Yass Plains in 1859.

Members for King and Georgiana

Election results

1856

1858

References

King and Georgiana
Constituencies established in 1856
Constituencies disestablished in 1859
1856 establishments in Australia
1859 disestablishments in Australia